Carl Magnus Lindgren (April 4, 1982 – November 19, 2012) was a Swedish chef. Lindgren was a senior chef at celebrity chef Heston Blumenthal’s flagship restaurant The Fat Duck, the Michelin-starred restaurant in Bray, Berkshire.

Death 
Lindgren died in November 2012 in a car accident in Hong Kong. He and British chef Jorge Arango Herrera were killed when the taxi they were riding in was crushed between two double-decker buses in Shau Kei Wan, a district in eastern Hong Kong island. Lindgren and Herrera, along with 53-year-old taxi driver Wong Kim-chung, were trapped in the cab for more than an hour before firemen could free them from the wreckage, they were all declared dead at hospital. More than 50 other people were also injured in the accident. The pair were in Asia at the invitation of the Mandarin Oriental Hotel where they were to cook a series of private meals alongside Heston Blumenthal.

References 

1982 births
2012 deaths
People from Tyresö Municipality
Swedish chefs
British restaurateurs
Head chefs of Michelin starred restaurants
Road incident deaths in Hong Kong